T. Raja (born 25 May 1961) is an Indian Civil Judge. Currently, he is the acting Chief Justice of the Madras High Court in Chennai.

Career
Hon'ble Thiru Justice T. Raja, was born on 25th May 1961 in a Village in Thenur, Madurai District. He had early Education till VIII standard in a Panchayat Union School in Thenur Village, from IX to XI Std, Pasumalai High School, Madurai, P.U.C. at Wakf Board College at Madurai, B.A. Degree at Madurai College, M.A. in Social Work at Madurai, and studied Law at Madurai Law college. After enrolment on 22.6.1988, he started law practice in the Madras High Court from June 1988 and was associated with Thiru. C. Selvaraj, Senior Advocate. After two and half years of practice, he shifted the practice to the Hon'ble Supreme Court at New Delhi. In New Delhi, he practiced in Civil, Criminal, Constitutional and Service laws before the High Court of Delhi, Central Administrative Tribunal and Supreme Court. He served as Standing Counsel for Dr. M.G.R. Medical University for about 10 years in the Hon'ble Supreme Court. He also served as Standing Counsel for E.S.I, before the Principal Bench, Central Administrative Tribunal, New Delhi as well as in Delhi High Court and in Supreme Court. He served as Standing Counsel for Supreme Court Legal Services Society for all Civil and Criminal matters for about 6 years. He was appointed as an Additional Advocate General at Madurai Bench of the Madras High Court on 09.02.2008 and appeared in several important cases. He was appointed as Additional Judge of Madras High Court on 31.03.2009. Performed the duties of the office of the Chief Justice as Acting Chief Justice from 22.09.2022.

References 

https://www.barandbench.com/news/supreme-court-collegium-recommends-transfer-of-madras-high-court-acting-chief-justice-t-raja-to-rajasthan-high-court

Indian judges
1961 births
Living people